Beau Black (born August 5, 1983) is an American composer, producer, musician, singer, songwriter, and instrumentalist from New York City, New York. He served as the primary songwriter for Disney's television show The Lion Guard, and received a Daytime Emmy Creative Arts nomination in 2017 in the category Outstanding Original Song for the Lion Guard song "Sisi Ni Sawa" (with Sarah Mirza, Ford Riley and Kevin Hopps) He received a 2nd Daytime Emmy Award in the category "Outstanding Original Song in a Children's, Young Adult or Animated Program" for “As You Move Forward” from The Lion Guard.

Life and work 
Beau Black is the son of Jay Black, lead singer of Jay and the Americans and his mother is Andi Black. Black’s first album of original music, Meant to Be, was released in 2008. Black has worked on shows including Miles from Tomorrowland, Penn Zero: Part Time Hero, The Lion Guard, Mickey and the Roadster Racers, Firebuds, TrollsTopia, Jake and the Neverland Pirates and The Rocketeer. He joined the creative team as a composer and songwriter for the Disney Junior production of the Mickey Mouse Funhouse Animated Series, which set to debut in 2021.

He was nominated for a 2017 Daytime Emmy award for composing the song “Sisi Ni Sawa” from The Lion Guard, a series that he served as the primary songwriter for.
In 2020, Black was named a nominee for the 47th Annual Daytime Emmy Award in the category "Outstanding Original Song in a Children's, Young Adult or Animated Program" for “As You Move Forward” from The Lion Guard.

Selective discography

Studio Album 
 Perfect Day (2014)
 Black & Bleu (with Bleu McAuley, 2013) 
 Meant to be (2008)

Television

Personal life
In 2011, he married British-Spanish singer, songwriter and actress Alex Cartana. They have 1 child, a daughter, who was born in 2021.

References

External links
 

Musicians from New York City
1983 births
Living people
American composers
American people of Jewish descent